Haigia is a genus of picture-winged flies in the family Ulidiidae.

Species
 H. nevadana

References

Ulidiidae
Taxa named by George C. Steyskal